Jules Zvunka (born 17 August 1941 in Le Ban-Saint-Martin, Moselle) is a retired French football player and manager.

He is the brother of Georges Zvunka and Victor Zvunka and played for Metz and Olympique Marseille.

References

External links
 Manager profile
 Player profile

1941 births
Living people
Sportspeople from Moselle (department)
French footballers
Association football defenders
FC Metz players
Olympique de Marseille players
Ligue 1 players
French football managers
Olympique de Marseille managers
Pays d'Aix FC managers
Footballers from Grand Est
French people of Romanian descent